Major General Nathan Mugisha is a military officer in Uganda People's Defence Force. He is the current Deputy Ambassador of Uganda to Somalia. He was appointed to that position in June 2011. Prior to that, he served as the Commander of the African Union Mission to Somalia (AMISOM), June 2009 until June 2011, being the third military officer to serve in that capacity. Before taking the command of AMISOM he was commandant of the Uganda Senior Command and Staff College, at Kimaka, a suburb of Jinja.

AMISOM
Major General Nathan Mugisha replaced Major General Francis Okello as commander of AMISOM on 7 July 2009. Under General Nathan Mugisha's command, AMISOM repelled the "Ramadan Offensive" launched by al-Shabaab during August 2010. In February and March 2011 AMISOM made significant progress in Mogadishu during the "Anti-insurgence offensive" and controlled approximately 50% of the city after that offensive.

Background
He was born in Western Uganda. He attended Ugandan schools prior to joining the Military of Uganda.

Career
In June 2005, at the rank of colonel, he was the commanding officer of the 4th Division of the Uganda People's Defence Force, based in the Northern Ugandan city of Gulu.
He later was appointed commandant of Uganda Senior Command and Staff College, before he was appointed Commander of AMISOM.

Succession table as commander of AMISOM

See also

References

External links
  Mogadishu Machinations: Is The Famine An Opportunity?
  Returned Exiles Offer Somalia Its Last Chance

Living people
People from Western Region, Uganda
Year of birth missing (living people)
Ugandan military personnel
Ugandan generals